Oltion Osmani (born 20 July 1972) is a former Albanian football who played for KF Elbasani, KF Tirana, Bylis Ballsh, Vllaznia Shkodër and Shkumbini Peqin in his career as well as the Albania national team.

International career
He made his debut for Albania in an August 1998 friendly match against Cyprus, his sole international game.

Honours
Albanian Superliga: 2
 1999, 2001

References

External links

1972 births
Living people
Footballers from Elbasan
Albanian footballers
Association football defenders
Albania international footballers
KF Elbasani players
KF Tirana players
KF Bylis Ballsh players
KF Vllaznia Shkodër players
KS Shkumbini Peqin players
Kategoria Superiore players